The office of the Speaker of the Navajo Nation Council was created in 1991 following restructuring of the Navajo Nation government. The Speaker is the head of the legislative branch and presides over sessions of the council. The Speaker of the council serve a term of two years during the administration of the incumbent President. The Office of the speaker is located in Window Rock, AZ at the Council Chambers.

Office holders

See also 

 President of the Navajo Nation
 Vice President of the Navajo Nation
 The Navajo Nation Council
 Navajo Nation presidential election, 2006
 Navajo Nation presidential election, 2010
 Navajo Nation presidential election, 2015
 Navajo Nation presidential election, 2018
 Navajo Nation presidential election, 2022

References 

Navajo Nation government